Aghori is an Indian television series that is produced by Essel Vision Productions. It was aired from 22 June to 29 September 2019 on Zee TV and starred Simaran Kaur, Parag Tyagi and Gaurav Chopra as Kamakshi, Rudranath and Advik.

Synopsis
The story of an Aghori. The show starts with Advik. He is called by Mahaguru Rudranath. Rudranaath say's Advik that he find the girl whom he had been looking for many years. Rudranath sends Advik to fetch that girl. Rudranath's disciple asks Rudranath why he wants the same girl. Rudranath then tells him that she is not a common girl. That girl was born dead and her guru Chaitanya gave her life with the power of Panchtatva. Mahaguru Chatanya put his life at stake while saving Kamakshi. Rudranath also kills Kamakshi's parents and then an Aghoran said Kamakshi's mother Priya that if Kamakshi is married before the completion of 23 years, Rudranath will not spoil her.

Cast

Main 
Simaran Kaur as Kamakshi Chandrashekhar
Gaurav Chopra as Advik / Adhvik Mehra
Parag Tyagi as Rudranath Bhairav / Aghori

Recurring 
 Nidhi Uttam as Priya Bhandari Chandrashekhar, Kamakshi's mother
 Charu Mehra as Rashi Bhandari, Kamakshi's cousin
Salman Shaikh as Chirag Bhandari, Kamakshi's cousin
 Geetanjali Mishra as Dravya Sunarivasan / Aghoran
 Preeti Puri as Suman Bhandari, Kamakshi's aunt
 Syed Zafar Ali as Jaibheem Bhandari, Kamakshi's uncle
 Hardika Joshi as Vipranjali "Vipra" Bhandari, Kamakshi's aunt
 Kasturi Banerjee
 Nikita Chopra
 Ibrar Yakub as Kamakshi's maternal uncle
 Vimarsh Roshan as Kamakshi's maternal uncle
 Ram Awana as Mahaguru Chatanya – Rudranaath's guru
 Vineet Kumar
 Aditya Deshmukh
 Poulomi Das as Ashmi
 Malhar Pandya as Aghori Indra
 Mahi Sharma
 Pakhi Mendola as Aaraa – Kamakshi's maternal uncle's daughter
 Paras Chhabra as Soham – an aghori

Episodes

References

External links
 Aghori on ZEE5 

2019 Indian television series debuts
Indian television soap operas
Zee TV original programming
Indian drama television series